Hamidabad may refer to:

Hamidabad, Ardabil
Hamidabad, Chaharmahal and Bakhtiari
Hamidabad, Pasargad, Fars Province
Hamidabad, Sepidan, Fars Province
Hamidabad, Anbarabad, Kerman Province
Hamidabad, Rafsanjan, Kerman Province
Hamidabad, Rigan, Kerman Province
Hamidabad, Sirjan, Kerman Province
Hamidabad, Omidiyeh, Khuzestan Province
Hamidabad, Shush, Khuzestan Province
Hamidabad, Mazandaran
Hamidabad, Qazvin
Hamidabad, Takestan, Qazvin
Hamidabad, Razavi Khorasan
Hamidabad, Dalgan, Sistan and Baluchestan Province
Hamidabad, Tehran